Far Beyond These Castle Walls is the first album by Chris de Burgh, released by A&M Records in 1974. The title refers to Bargy Castle, which is shown on the back of the album cover.

Reception
Billboard in its review of 29 March 1975 considered the album's "sophisticated lyrics and production are good for college market" and expressed a hope that A&M Records will found "another deserving artist" in face of Chris De Burg.
Mike DeGagne of AllMusic retrospectively praised the album, saying: "His gentle, beguiling vocal style is introduced, which instantly trademarks him as a genuine master of the soft ballad... What is most important about this album is the manner in which it reveals de Burgh as one of the finest mood-invoking artists ever."

Track listing
All compositions by Chris de Burgh

"Hold On" – 4:03
"The Key" – 4:08
"Windy Night" – 4:53
"Sin City" – 4:35
"New Moon" – 4:59
"Watching the World" – 3:32
"Lonesome Cowboy" – 4:23
"Satin Green Shutters" – 5:02
"Turning Round", released outside the UK and Ireland as "Flying" – 6:24
"Goodnight" – 2:07

Musicians 

 Chris de Burgh – lead and backing vocals, acoustic guitars, additional synthesizers
 Ray Glynn – electric guitars
 B.J. Cole – pedal steel guitar
 Ray Jackson – harmonica, mandolin
 Brian Odgers – bass guitar
 Chris Laurence – double bass
 Ronnie Leahy – keyboards
 Ken Freeman – string synthesizer
 Phillip Goodhand-Tait – harmonium
 Barry De Souza – drums
 Lennox Laington – percussion
 Del Newman – arrangements (1, 8)
 Richard Hewson – arrangements (2, 9)
 Chris Hughes – brass arrangements
 Madeleine Bell – backing vocals
 Liza Strike – backing vocals
 Joy Yates – backing vocals

Production 

 Produced and Engineered by Robin Geoffrey Cable
 Assistant Engineers – Mark Dodson and Mike Stavrou
 Recorded at Ramport Studios and AIR Studios (London, UK).
 Mixed at AIR Studios and Trident Studios (London, UK).
 Art Direction – Fabio Nicoli
 Design – Nick Marshall
 Photography – Dave Morse

Notes 

Chris de Burgh albums
1974 debut albums
A&M Records albums
Albums recorded at Trident Studios
Albums recorded at AIR Studios